Shadowmation is a patented animation process created by Mitchell Kriegman. It uses realtime virtual sets and bunraku style team puppetry (some puppets are controlled by up to three puppeteers), thus combining live action animatronic characters with computer generated animation in real time, high definition virtual environments powered by video game engines. The resulting effect combines all the advantages of animatronics, the expressiveness of live performance, and the limitless freedom of computer animation. The end result is a distinctive and compelling immersive visual experience.

Wainscott Studios, NY is the home base for the process.

Examples
Shadowmation is a relatively new technique, but has so far been used in several prominent children's television shows, including Disney's The Book of Pooh, PBS's It's a Big, Big World,  and CBC Television and Discovery Kids' Wilbur. The Jim Henson Company's Bear in the Big Blue House and Animal Jam utilized this technique for their opening sequences. This technique was also used in The Adventures of Elmo in Grouchland for the song "Take the First Step".

References

Animation techniques
Puppetry
Animatronics